The Rivière au Saumon (English: Salmon River) is a tributary of the northeast shore of James Bay, flowing in the municipality of Baie-James, in the administrative region from Nord-du-Québec, in the province of Quebec, in Canada.

This northern area of Quebec does not have passable roads. However, in winter, snowmobiles are used to circulate in this area.

Geography 
The Salmon River originates at the mouth of an unidentified lake in the northwest part of the territory from Baie-James. This source is located at:
  north-east of Pointe Louis-XIV which delimits Hudson Bay and James Bay;
  north of the mouth of the rivière au Phoque (Baie James);
  north-west of the village centre of Radisson which is situated on the west bank of the Robert-Bourassa Reservoir.

  to the southwest crossing a small lake, then crossing Lake Nanuup, to its mouth;
  first towards the southwest crossing an unidentified lake in forming a loop towards the southwest, then crossing Lake Mayuagag first towards the northeast to go around a peninsula, then southwesterly, to its mouth;
  south-west, to its mouth.

The Rivière au Salmon flows into the bottom of a bay on the northeast shore of James Bay. This confluence is located at:

  east of a small regional airport;
  north-west of the mouth of the Seal River;
  north-east of Pointe Louis-XIV.

Toponymy 
The toponym “Rivière au Saumon” was formalized on December 5, 1968, at the Place Names Bank of the Commission de toponymie du Québec.

See also 

 List of rivers of Quebec

Notes and references 

Rivers of Nord-du-Québec
Eeyou Istchee James Bay